Gharsana Tehsil is a tehsil located in the south of the Shrigangagnagar district of Rajasthan, India. It is bordered by Anupgarh tehsil in the north, by Chhatargarh, Rawla Mandi tehsil, tehsils of Bikaner district in the southeast. The western border touches Fort Abbas Tehsil of Bahawalnagar district of Pakistani Punjab.

As per the 2011 Gharsana census, population is 26,830.

Demography
In the census of 2011 the population of Gharsana was 26,830.

Major villages are:

 Gharsana (3STR & 24 AS-c)
 365 Head is a sub-tehsil

References

External links 
 Gharsana tehsil district website

Sri Ganganagar district
Tehsils of Rajasthan